Hippodrome Deauville-La Touques is a race track for thoroughbred horse racing located in Deauville in the Calvados département, in the Normandy région of France. Originally called Hippodrome de la Touques, it was named for the Touques River that separates the city of Deauville from Trouville-sur-Mer. It was constructed in 1862 by Charles Auguste Louis Joseph, duc de Morny, the half brother of Napoleon III.

The countryside around Deauville is the main horse breeding region in France and home to numerous stud farms.

Races
Group 1:
 Prix Jacques Le Marois
 Prix Jean Romanet
 Prix Maurice de Gheest
 Prix Morny
 Prix Rothschild
 Prix Jean Prat

Group 2:
 Grand Prix de Deauville
 Prix Guillaume d'Ornano
 Prix Kergorlay
 Prix de Pomone

Group 3:
 Prix de Cabourg
 Prix du Calvados
 Prix Gontaut-Biron
 Prix de Lieurey
 Prix de Meautry
 Prix Minerve
 Prix de la Nonette
 Prix de Psyché
 Prix Quincey
 Prix des Réservoirs
 Prix François Boutin

Listed:
 Prix Yacowlef

See also 

 Deauville-Clairefontaine Racecourse

References
 Deauville-La Touques Racecourse at France Galop

 
Deauville
Sports venues in Calvados (department)
Tourist attractions in Normandy
1862 establishments in France